Nancy Sweetnam (born August 14, 1973) is a Canadian former competition swimmer who swam primarily in medley events.  Sweetnam represented Canada in two consecutive Summer Olympics.

At the 1992 Summer Olympics in Barcelona, Spain, she finished in seventh place in the women's 200-metre individual medley, and thirteenth in the 400-metre individual medley.  Four years later at the 1996 Summer Olympics in Atlanta, United States, she ended up in eleventh position in the 400-metre individual medley, after winning the silver medal in the same event at the 1995 FINA Short Course World Championships in Rio de Janeiro.

She is a cousin of Canadian pop-rock singer-songwriter Skye Sweetnam.

References 
 Canadian Olympic Committee

External links 
 

1973 births
Living people
Canadian female medley swimmers
Medalists at the FINA World Swimming Championships (25 m)
Olympic swimmers of Canada
Sportspeople from Kawartha Lakes
Sportspeople from Ontario
Swimmers at the 1992 Summer Olympics
Swimmers at the 1996 Summer Olympics
Commonwealth Games medallists in swimming
Commonwealth Games gold medallists for Canada
Commonwealth Games silver medallists for Canada
Commonwealth Games bronze medallists for Canada
Swimmers at the 1990 Commonwealth Games
Universiade medalists in swimming
Universiade gold medalists for Canada
Universiade silver medalists for Canada
Medallists at the 1990 Commonwealth Games